Diego Milán Jiménez (born 10 July 1985) is a Spanish-born professional road bicycle racer, who currently rides for Dominican amateur team . Since 2012, Milán competes under a licence from the Dominican Republic, having been born in Spain.

Professional career
Born in Almansa, Spain, Milán won the Dominican Republic National Road Race Championships in 2013 and 2014.

Milán was the first Dominican cyclist to ever participate in the Olympic Games when he participated in the individual road race, but did not finish.

Major results

2006
 3rd Clásica Memorial Txuma
 7th Overall Vuelta a la Comunidad de Madrid
1st Stage 2
2007
 5th Liège–Bastogne–Liège U23
 5th Circuito de Getxo
 7th Clásica Memorial Txuma
2008
 1st Stage 2 Vuelta a La Rioja
 1st Stage 2 GP Paredes Rota dos Móveis
2009
 5th Overall Tour of Turkey
2010
 5th Overall Vuelta a la Independencia Nacional
 6th Overall Tour do Rio
2011
 5th Circuito de Getxo
 7th Clásica de Almería
2012
 7th Overall Vuelta a la Independencia Nacional
1st  Points classification
1st Stages 1, 4 & 5
 7th Bucks County Classic
2013
 1st  Road race, National Road Championships
 1st Stage 6 Tour de Beauce
 8th Overall Tour de Guadeloupe
1st Stages 4 & 9
2014
 1st  Road race, National Road Championships
 1st Stage 5 Tour de Guadeloupe
2015
 2nd Road race, National Road Championships
 2nd Overall Tour de Guadeloupe
1st Stage 7
 4th Overall Grand Prix Cycliste de Saguenay
 5th Overall Vuelta a la Independencia Nacional
 10th Road race, Pan American Games
2016
 5th Overall Vuelta a la Independencia Nacional
2017
 7th Road race, Pan American Road Championships
 7th Overall Tour de Guadeloupe
1st  Points classification
1st  Mountains classification
 7th Overall Grand Prix Cycliste de Saguenay
2018
 4th Winston-Salem Cycling Classic
 8th Overall Tour de Guadeloupe
 9th Overall Tour du Maroc
2019
 1st Stage 5 Tour de Beauce
 3rd Road race, National Road Championships
 3rd Overall Grand Prix Cycliste de Saguenay
 5th Overall Tour de Guadeloupe
 6th Overall Tour du Maroc
 6th Winston-Salem Cycling Classic

References

External links
 

1985 births
Living people
Spanish male cyclists
Dominican Republic male cyclists
Cyclists at the 2015 Pan American Games
Pan American Games competitors for the Dominican Republic
People from Almansa
Sportspeople from the Province of Albacete
Tour de Guadeloupe stage winners
Cyclists at the 2016 Summer Olympics
Olympic cyclists of the Dominican Republic
Cyclists from Castilla-La Mancha